Vencer (English: Overcoming) is media franchise of Mexican television series created by Rosy Ocampo, produced by TelevisaUnivision, and broadcast on Las Estrellas. Each series revolves around four women of different ages and touches on different issues inherent to women, such as gender violence, teenage pregnancy, and cyberbullying.

Overview

Vencer el miedo 

Vencer el miedo follows four women from the same family intertwined with social issues such as teenage pregnancy, sexual harassment and gender inequality.

Vencer el desamor 

Vencer el desamor follows four women with nothing in common that are forced to live under the same roof, although it is complicated at first, sisterhood and solidarity will prevail when they realize that they all share the experience of heartbreak.

Vencer el pasado 

Vencer el pasado follows four women from different social classes who, due to different circumstances, become victims of cyberbullying and must overcome it in order to move forward with their lives.

Vencer la ausencia 

Vencer la ausencia tells the story of four close-knit women who share the experience of tragic losses.

Cast

Upcoming 
In October 2022, Rosy Ocampo announced that she was developing a fifth series for the franchise. On 4 November 2022, it was announced that Vencer la culpa would be the title of the fifth series.

Production 
Filming of Vencer el miedo began on 2 July 2019. Vencer el desamor was announced in February 2020, with filming taking place from 30 June 2020 to 16 December 2020. Vencer el pasado was announced on 12 January 2021, with filming taking place from 8 April 2021 to 28 August 2021. Vencer la ausencia was announced on 1 November 2021, with filming beginning in April 2022.

References 

Television franchises
Mass media franchises introduced in 2020